The 1957 North Texas State Eagles football team was an American football team that represented North Texas State College (now known as the University of North Texas) during the 1957 NCAA University Division football season as a member of the Missouri Valley Conference. In their 12th year under head coach Odus Mitchell, the team compiled a 5–5 record.

Integration of major college football in Texas
The additions of Abner Haynes and Leon King to North Texas State's varsity team in 1957 marked the first time any Black players had suited up for a major college football team in the state of Texas. King scored a touchdown in their season opener against Texas Western on September 21, but North Texas State came up just short in a 14-13 loss.

Schedule

References

North Texas State
North Texas Mean Green football seasons
Missouri Valley Conference football champion seasons
North Texas State Mean Green football